Daniel F. Cyganowski (July 6, 1921 - March 3, 1983) was a bishop of the Buffalo-Pittsburgh Diocese Polish National Catholic Church. He was born in East Chicago, Indiana and graduated from Savonarola Theological Seminary in Scranton, Pennsylvania. Cyganowski served parishes in Pennsylvania, Illinois, and Indiana and was diocesan bishop from 1971 to 1977. He received the Am-Pol Eagle Citizen of the Year Award for civic leadership in 1975.

References 
Obituary, The Times (Munster Indiana), March 8, 1983, page 16.

External links 
Find a Grave

American bishops
American Polish National Catholics
Bishops of the Polish National Catholic Church
American people of Polish descent
1921 births
1983 deaths
20th-century American clergy